Automotive industry in Taiwan refers to the automotive industry in Taiwan.

Manufacturers

In total, there are around 3,000 automotive-related companies in Taiwan. Hotai Motor accounted for 28.8% of the total cars sold in Taiwan, followed by China Motor Corporation (10.9%), Yulon Nissan Motor Corporation (9.6%) and Honda Taiwan (7.7%).

Exports and imports
Around 41.7% of vehicles sold in Taiwan were imported. In 2016, around 75% of automotive parts and components produced in Taiwan were exported, mainly to the United States (43%, valued at NT$67.8 billion), Japan (6%, valued at NT$9.5 billion), Mainland China (5%, valued at NT$8.2 billion) and United Kingdom (4%, valued at NT$5.6 billion).

Economy
Annually, there are 400,000 cars sold in Taiwan. In total, the output of the entire automotive industries in Taiwan accounted for almost 3% of Taiwan's gross domestic product. In 2016, the output of automotive industry in Taiwan amounted US$20 billion, which was divided into parts and components manufacturing (US$7 billion), domestic car production (US$6.5 billion) and vehicle electronics (US$6 billion). In 2013, the automotive industry output accounted for 2.7% of Taiwan's total manufacturing output.

Taiwanese firms increasingly invested in automotive electrification, 75% of Tesla, Inc.’s suppliers are Taiwanese. Taiwan is one of the few places in the world with a comprehensive EV supply chain and Taiwan is an integral part of global EV supply chains.

Research
Automotive-related research institutes in Taiwan are Automotive Research & Testing Center and Industrial Technology Research Institute.

See also
 List of Taiwanese automakers

References